James Mercer may refer to:

 James Mercer (jurist) (1736–1793), American jurist, Virginia delegate to Continental Congress
 James Mercer (Australian politician) (1842–1925), New South Wales politician
 James Mercer (mathematician) (1883–1932), English mathematician
 James Mercer (musician) (born 1970), American guitarist and musician
 Bert Mercer (James Cuthbert Mercer, 1886–1944), New Zealand aviator
 James Mercer (diplomat), former Ghanaian ambassador to Israel and chairman of Ghana Airways

See also
 Jimmie Mercer (1871–1914), American lawman born James Arthur Mercer